Favona is a mostly industry-dominated suburb of Auckland, New Zealand, and is part of the Māngere area. The suburb is in the Manukau ward, one of the thirteen administrative divisions of Auckland city, and is under governance of the Auckland Council.

The area has a long history of habitation, due to its fertile lands, a productive harbour, and proximity to the Manukau-Tamaki isthmus. Māori of Ngāti Whātua were the inhabitants until they were supplanted by European farmers in the 19th century. The development of market gardening brought more people into the area and the land remained used in this way until the 1960s when housing developments were created to service Auckland's growing population and industry in nearby Onehunga and Otahuhu. Some areas of Favona also historically had large areas of greenhouses, such as for tomato production.

The area is one is of relative poverty and until 2005 had one of New Zealand's largest Caravan parks. It hosts the Mangere campus of Te Wānanga o Aotearoa. Numerous shipping and freight forwarding companies have premises in the industrial areas, including the national distribution headquarters of supermarket chain Progressive Enterprises.

Demographics

Favona had a population of 9,684 at the 2018 New Zealand census, an increase of 1,170 people (13.7%) since the 2013 census, and an increase of 2,196 people (29.3%) since the 2006 census. There were 1,959 households, comprising 4,866 males and 4,824 females, giving a sex ratio of 1.01 males per female, with 2,592 people (26.8%) aged under 15 years, 2,517 (26.0%) aged 15 to 29, 3,840 (39.7%) aged 30 to 64, and 735 (7.6%) aged 65 or older.

Ethnicities were 12.2% European/Pākehā, 14.2% Māori, 64.8% Pacific peoples, 21.3% Asian, and 1.3% other ethnicities. People may identify with more than one ethnicity.

The percentage of people born overseas was 43.5, compared with 27.1% nationally.

Although some people chose not to answer the census's question about religious affiliation, 15.1% had no religion, 64.6% were Christian, 1.1% had Māori religious beliefs, 7.4% were Hindu, 4.3% were Muslim, 1.1% were Buddhist and 1.1% had other religions.

Of those at least 15 years old, 873 (12.3%) people had a bachelor's or higher degree, and 1,572 (22.2%) people had no formal qualifications. 468 people (6.6%) earned over $70,000 compared to 17.2% nationally. The employment status of those at least 15 was that 3,507 (49.5%) people were employed full-time, 777 (11.0%) were part-time, and 507 (7.1%) were unemployed.

Education

It caters for students with intellectual disability or special needs.

All these schools are coeducational. Rolls are as of

References

External links 
Photographs of Favona held in Auckland Libraries' heritage collections.

Suburbs of Auckland
Poverty in New Zealand
Working class in New Zealand
Māngere-Ōtāhuhu Local Board Area
Populated places around the Manukau Harbour